|}

The Palace House Stakes is a Group 3 flat horse race in Great Britain open to horses aged three years or older. It is run over a distance of 5 furlongs (1,006 metres) on the Rowley Mile at Newmarket in late April or early May.

History
The event is named after Palace House, a famous building in Newmarket on the site of a royal residence of King Charles II.

The race was established in 1961, and the first running was won by Galivanter. It was given Group 3 status when the present grading system was introduced in 1971.

The Palace House Stakes is currently held on the opening day of Newmarket's Guineas Festival meeting. It is run on the same day as the 2000 Guineas.

Records

Most successful horse (2 wins):
 Sole Power – 2013, 2014
 Mabs Cross - 2018, 2019

Leading jockey (2 wins):
 Ron Hutchinson – Ruby Laser (1964), Tamino (1966)
 Lester Piggott – Communication (1971), Valeriga (1980)
 Yves Saint-Martin – Raga Navarro (1977), Standaan (1981)
 Greville Starkey – Vaigly Great (1979), Hallgate (1987)
 Steve Cauthen – Lightning Label (1982), Elbio (1991)
 Frankie Dettori – Statoblest (1990), Lochsong (1994)
 John Carroll – Paris House (1993), Mind Games (1995)
 Michael Kinane – Cool Jazz (1996), Rushcutter Bay (2001)
 Michael Roberts – Deep Finesse (1997), Yorkies Boy (1998)
 Tom Eaves – Captain Gerrard (2008), Tangerine Trees (2011)
 Paul Mulrennan - Mabs Cross (2018, 2019)
 William Buick - Lazuli (2021), Khaadem (2022)

Leading trainer (2 wins):
 Dick Hern – Galivanter (1961), Crisper (1962)
 Doug Marks – Shiny Tenth (1972), Singing Bede (1974)
 Luca Cumani – Valeriga (1980), Statoblest (1990)
 Bill O'Gorman – On Stage (1983), Reesh (1984)
 Ian Balding – Silver Fling (1989), Lochsong (1994)
 Jack Berry – Paris House (1993), Mind Games (1995)
 Bryan McMahon – Yorkies Boy (1998), Needwood Blade (2003)
 Henry Candy – Kyllachy (2002), Amour Propre (2009)
 Bryan Smart – Captain Gerrard (2008), Tangerine Trees (2011)
 Edward Lynam – Sole Power (2013, 2014)
 Michael Dods - Mabs Cross (2018, 2019)

Winners since 1979

Earlier winners

 1961: Galivanter
 1962: Crisper
 1963: Sammy Davis
 1964: Ruby Laser
 1965: Runnymede
 1966: Tamino
 1967: Heavenly Sound
 1968: Mountain Call
 1969: Be Friendly
 1970: Tower Walk
 1971: Communication
 1972: Shiny Tenth
 1973: Brave Lad
 1974: Singing Bede
 1975: Hot Spark
 1976: Polly Peachum
 1977: Raga Navarro
 1978: Frimley Park

See also
 Horse racing in Great Britain
 List of British flat horse races

References

 Paris-Turf:
 Racing Post:

 galopp-sieger.de – Palace House Stakes.
 ifhaonline.org – International Federation of Horseracing Authorities – Palace House Stakes (2019).
 pedigreequery.com – Palace House Stakes – Newmarket.
 

Open sprint category horse races
Newmarket Racecourse
Flat races in Great Britain
1961 establishments in England
Recurring sporting events established in 1961